A Millionaire's First Love  is a 2006 South Korean romance film directed by Kim Tae-kyun, starring Hyun Bin and Lee Yeon-hee. The theme of the film is "Nothing is more important than the true love of your heart." It was released in South Korean cinemas on February 9, 2006, and recorded 639,596 admissions during its run.

Plot
Kang Jae-kyung (Hyun Bin) is a typical rich kid. He is arrogant, drives sporty cars, attends the big clubs and rides through school corridors on his motorcycle. As his 18th birthday approaches, he is set to inherit his grandfather's fortune, but first Jae-kyung is required to transfer to a new school in Gangwon Province and graduate. Until then all access to his penthouse, cottage and credit cards are denied. Should he fail to graduate or drops out then he loses everything. If he wishes to give up, he will only receive 0.1% of his over-all inheritance. With this in mind, he heads out to the countryside, to a small town in which daily life is far removed from what he is used to.

Cast
 Hyun Bin as Kang Jae-kyung
 Lee Yeon-hee as Choi Eun-hwan
 Yong-Joon Cho as Goo-Ho
 Do-hyeon Lee 
 Han-sol Lee as Myungshik
 Lim Ju-hwan as Seung-joon
 Hak-yeong Ye
 Kim Ki-doo as Pyung-Chang's classmate 3

Soundtrack
 Prologue
 Insa (Farewell) - Jaejoong from TVXQ
 거친 나의 나날들 
 Gray Noise - Yeongene
 기억을 따라가는 재경 (Memories Follow Jae-kyung)
 털양말 (Feather Socks)
 피리부는 소녀 (Flute Girl)
 Dialogue 1
 우리 은환이 좀 살려주세요 (Please Let Eun-hwan Live)
 Dialogue 2
 Kiss
 이제 너 많이 힘들어 지겠다 (It Will Be Really Hard for You Now)
 Dialogue 3
 들판을 거닐며 
 Insa (Inst.)
 Dialogue 4
 Insa - Lee Yeon-hee
 Dialogue 5
 첫눈 (First Snow)
 Insa - TVXQ
 Dialogue 6

International release

Remake
It inspired the Nepali film Mero Euta Saathi Chha (2009), the Turkish film Sendan Bana Kalan and the Telugu film Pilla Zamindar (2011). All remakes were hits at the box office in their respective countries.

References

External links
 
 
 

2006 films
2006 romantic drama films
South Korean romantic drama films
Films directed by Kim Tae-kyun
Lotte Entertainment films
2000s Korean-language films
South Korean films remade in other languages
2000s South Korean films